Nahid Hasan (born 21 May 1997) is a Bangladeshi cricketer. He made his List A debut for Kala Bagan Krira Chakra in the 2016–17 Dhaka Premier Division Cricket League on 29 April 2017. He made his Twenty20 debut for Uttara Sporting Club in the 2018–19 Dhaka Premier Division Twenty20 Cricket League on 26 February 2019.

References

External links
 

1997 births
Living people
Bangladeshi cricketers
Kala Bagan Krira Chakra cricketers
Uttara Sporting Club cricketers
Place of birth missing (living people)